The Battle of Frankfurt was a four-day struggle for control of Frankfurt am Main during World War II. The 5th Infantry Division conducted the main attack while the 6th Armored Division provided support. The city was defended by the LXXX Corps of the Seventh Army.

Prelude 
The 5th Infantry Division crossed the Rhine on 22 March and quickly established a bridgehead. By 23 March, the 5th had expanded its bridgehead five miles east, putting the division only 14 miles southwest of Frankfurt. Armored Task Forces pushed from the bridgehead then to the North towards Trebur and Gustavsburg and to the East towards Darmstadt.

On 25 March, the Wehrmacht Commander of the Darmstadt garrison surrendered and Darmstadt was liberated by the 6th Armored and 5th Infantry Divisions. By 26 March, the 5th reached the southern outskirts of the city of Frankfurt and captured the Rhine-Main airbase.

Battle 
The 6th linked up with the 5th and pushed through the southern outskirts (Sachsenhausen) to the river Main. There, units of the 5th found the mostly intact Wilhelmsbruecke bridge (today known as the Friedensbruecke). German engineers had tried to blow it up in the attempt to stop the US Forces on 25 March but failed to do so. Supported by US tank artillery, the troops of the 5th crossed the Wilhelmsbruecke under heavy fire on 27 March and entered the northern part of the city. The two divisions then fought the Germans in fierce house-to-house combat, slowly pushing through the city to the north and to the east.

Allied attacks killed the local commander on 27 March, crippling German military command in the city. On 29 March, the city was brought under American control and a pontoon bridge built by combat engineers on the eastern side of the damaged Wilhelmsbruecke. After initially attempting to set up defensive machine gun positions, German soldiers were convinced by citizens to leave the city and minimise additional casualties. The remaining Wehrmacht are pushed northwards and out of the city by US troops.

Aftermath 
AFN Luxembourg reported the city as liberated, however, small sporadic fighting continued until 4 April. Vogue war correspondent Lee Miller accompanied General Patton's Third Army and was among the first to report in the U.S. press on the liberation of Frankfurt. The Stars & Stripes reported the city as liberated on 30 March. After capturing Frankfurt, the 5th Division spent a few days resting until 7 April when it was ordered to move north to support the III Corps of the First Army in the Ruhr Pocket.

References

Battle of Frankfurt
Battles of World War II involving the United States
Battles of World War II involving Germany
1945 in Germany
20th century in Frankfurt
March 1945 events